is the headquarters and main development facility for the Japan Aerospace Exploration Agency (JAXA).

The Chōfu Aerospace Center concentrates on aerospace engineering research and development, and is equipped with test facilities including several wind tunnels, materials test facilities, flight simulators, engine test stands and a supercomputer.

References
 Harvey, Brian. Emerging Space Powers: The New Space Programs of Asia, the Middle East and South America. Springer (2011)

External links
JAXA official home page 
  Official JAXA channel

Space program of Japan
Space technology research institutes
Chōfu, Tokyo